The 2012 Highland Council election took place on 3 May 2012 to elect members of Highland Council. The election used the twenty-two wards created as a result of the Local Governance (Scotland) Act 2004, with each ward electing three or four Councillors using the single transferable vote system (a form of proportional representation) and 80 Councillors being elected.

The election saw Independent councillors remain the largest group, while the Scottish National Party increased their representation, replacing the Scottish Liberal Democrats in second place. The Scottish Labour Party also gained an additional seat. Following the election an administration was formed between the Scottish National Party, the Scottish Liberal Democrats and the Scottish Labour Party. This was the first time that the Independents have not had any role in the administration of the council.

Election result

Note: "Votes" are the first preference votes. The net gain/loss and percentage changes relate to the result of the previous Scottish local elections on 3 May 2007. This may differ from other published sources showing gain/loss relative to seats held at dissolution of Scotland's councils.

Ward results

North, West and Central Sutherland
2007: 1xSNP; 1xLib Dem; 1xIndependent
2012: 1xSNP; 1xLib Dem; 1xIndependent
2007-2012 Change: No change

Thurso
2007: 2xIndependent; 1xLib Dem
2012: 2xIndependent; 1xLab
2007-2012 Change: Lab gain one seat from Lib Dem

Wick
2007: 2xIndependent; 1xLib Dem
2012: 1xSNP; 1xLab; 1xIndependent
2007-2012 Change: SNP and Lab gain one seat from Lib Dem and Independent

Landward Caithness
2007: 2xIndependent; 1xSNP; 1xLib Dem 
2012: 3xIndependent; 1xSNP
2007-2012 Change: Independent gain one seat from Lib Dem

East Sutherland and Edderton
2007: 1xLib Dem; 1xLab; 1xIndependent
2012: 1xLab; 1xIndependent; 1xSNP
2007-2012 Change: SNP gain one seat from Lib Dem

* = Sitting Councillor from a different Ward.

Wester Ross, Strathpeffer and Lochalsh
2007: 2xIndependent; 1xSNP; 1xLib Dem
2012: 2xIndependent; 1xLib Dem; 1xSNP
2007-2012 Change: No change

Cromarty Firth
2007: 2xIndependent; 1xSNP; 1xLib Dem
2012: 2xIndependent; 1xSNP; 1xLib Dem
2007-2012 Change: No change

Tain and Easter Ross
2007: 2xIndependent; 1xLib Dem 
2012: 2xIndependent; 1xLib Dem
2007-2012 Change: No change

Dingwall and Seaforth
2007: 2xIndependent; 1xLib Dem; 1xSNP
2012: 2xIndependent; 1xLib Dem; 1xSNP
2007-2012 Change: No change

Black Isle
2007: 2xIndependent; 1xLib Dem; 1xSNP
2012: 2xIndependent; 1xLib Dem; 1xSNP
2007-2012 Change: No change

Eilean a' Cheò
2007: 2xIndependent; 1xLib Dem; 1xSNP
2012: 2xIndependent; 1xSNP; 1xLib Dem
2007-2012 Change: No change

Caol and Mallaig
2007: 3xIndependent
2012: 3xIndependent
2007-2012 Change: No change

Aird and Loch Ness
2007: 2xIndependent; 1xSNP; 1xLib Dem
2012: 2xIndependent; 1xSNP; 1xLib Dem
2007-2012 Change: No change

Inverness West
2007: 1xSNP; 1xLib Dem; 1xIndependent 
2012: 1xLib Dem; 1xIndependent; 1xSNP
2007-2012 Change: No change

Inverness Central
2007: 1xSNP; 1xIndependent; 1xLib Dem; 1xLab
2012: 2xSNP; 1xIndependent; 1xLab
2007-2012 Change: SNP gain one seat from Lib Dem

Inverness Ness-side
2007: 1xLib Dem; 1xSNP; 1xIndependent; 1xLab
2012: 1xSNP; 1xLib Dem; 1xLab; 1xIndependent
2007-2012 Change: No change

* = Sitting Councillor from a different Ward.

Inverness Millburn
2007: 1xLab; 1xSNP; 1xLib Dem
2012: 1xLab; 1xSNP; 1xLib Dem
2007-2012 Change: No change

Culloden and Ardersier
2007: 1xSNP; 1xIndependent; 1xLab; 1xLib Dem
2012: 1xIndependent; 1xLib Dem; 1xSNP; 1xLab
2007-2012 Change: No change

Nairn
2007: 2xIndependent; 1xSNP; 1xLib Dem
2012: 2xIndependent; 2xSNP
2007-2012 Change: SNP gain one seat from Lib Dem

Inverness South
2007: 1xSNP; 1xLib Dem; 1xLab; 1xIndependent 
2012: 2xLib Dem; 1xSNP; 1xIndependent
2007-2012 Change: Lib Dem gain one seat from Lab

Badenoch and Strathspey
2007: 2xIndependent; 1xLib Dem; 1xSNP 
2012: 2xSNP; 1xIndependent; 1xLib Dem
2007-2012 Change: SNP gain one seat from Independent

Fort William and Ardnamurchan
2007: 1xLib Dem; 1xIndependent; 1xSNP; 1xLab 
2012: 2xIndependent; 1xSNP; 1xLab
2007-2012 Change: Independent gain one seat from Lib Dem

Post Election Changes
† On 5 May 2012 Wester Ross, Strathpeffer and Lochalsh Cllr Biz Campbell quit the Liberal Democrats and became an Independent. 
†† On 18 June 2012 Caol and Mallaig Cllr Bill Clark joined the Scottish National Party and ceased to be an Independent.
††† On 16 October 2012 Inverness Central Cllr Donnie Kerr quit the Scottish National Party and became a non-aligned Independent.  On 15 December 2014 he joined the Highland Alliance along with former Liberal Democrat Cllrs Drew Millar and Martin Rattray and former Independents Andrew Baxter and Thomas MacLennan.Breakaway councillors aim to protect Highland communities 
†††† On 10 December 2012 Landward Caithness Cllr Alex MacLeod quit the Scottish National Party regarding alleged offences under the Representation of the People Act 1983 and became an Independent Nationalist. He subsequently resigned his seat and a by-election was held on 28 November 2013 which was won by the Independent Matthew Reiss. Youngest councillor Alex MacLeod charged over election expenses
††††† On 28 February 2013 Landward Caithness Independent Cllr Robert Coghill resigned on medical grounds. A by-election was held on 2 May 2013 and was won by his daughter, Gillian Coghill. 
†††††† On 23 October 2013 Black Isle Independent Cllr Billy Barclay died. A by-election was held on 19 December 2013 to fill the vacancy which was won by his widow, Jennifer, also an Independent. Tributes to Black Isle councillor and farmer Barclay
††††††† On 9 January 2014 Caol and Mallaig Independent Cllr Eddie Fisher announced he was resigning from the council as he is moving away from the region. A by-election was held on 1 May 2014 to fill the vacancy which was won by the Independent, Ben Thompson. The Oban Times | Lochaber
†††††††† On 15 March 2015 Nairn SNP Cllr Colin John MacRury MacAulay resigned his seat on medical grounds  A by-election was held on 7 May 2015 and the seat was held by the SNP's Stephen Fuller.
††††††††† On 28 May 2015 North, West and Central Sutherland Cllr Linda Munro quit the Liberal Democrats and became an Independent.
†††††††††† On 7 May 2015 Aird and Loch Ness SNP Cllr Drew Hendry was elected as an MP for the Inverness, Nairn, Badenoch and Strathspey constituency. He resigned his Council seat on 13 July 2015 and a by-election was held on 8 October 2015.Highland by-election set for October The by-election was won by the Liberal Democrat Dr Jean Davis.
††††††††††† On 12 May 2016 Badenoch and Strathspey SNP Cllr David Fallows quit the party over key policies and joined the Highland Alliance.
†††††††††††† On 21 July 2016 Culloden and Ardersier Labour Cllr John Ford died suddenly while on holiday in Jersey. A by-election was held on 6 October 2016 which was won by the Liberal Democrat's Trish Robertson.

By-elections since 2012

Landward Caithness

Landward Caithness

Caol and Mallaig

Black Isle

Nairn

Aird and Loch Ness

Culloden and Ardersier

References

Highland Council election results 2012

2012
2012 Scottish local elections